15km or 15km may refer to:

15km, common course in Road running
15 km (village)